Alpine Skiing at the 1988 Winter Olympics consisted of ten alpine skiing events, held February 15–27 at Nakiska on Mount Allan,
a new ski area west of Calgary.

These Olympics featured the first change in the alpine skiing program in more than 30 years. The Super-G was added and the  combined event returned; it was last contested at the Winter Olympics in 1948, prior to the addition of the giant slalom.

Background 
On February 25, 1988, 47 year old Austrian Olympic Team physician Joerg Oberhammer died after falling into the path of a snow-grooming machine after colliding with another skier between runs of the men's giant slalom. Swiss team skiers Pirmin Zurbriggen and Martin Hangl witnessed Oberhammer's death from the chairlift, Zurbriggen went on to win a gold medal, while Hangl withdrew from the giant slalom due to the incident.

A total of 14 competitors, including the entire Canadian team was disqualified from the event after organizers became aware their ski suits were not previously approved by the International Ski Federation.

Medal summary
Nine nations won medals in alpine skiing, as Switzerland led the medal table with eleven (three gold, four silver, and four bronze), followed by Austria with six. Vreni Schneider of Switzerland and Alberto Tomba of Italy shared the lead in the individual medal table with two gold medals each.

Medal table

Source:

Men's events

Source:

Women's events

Source:

Course information

Source:

Participating nations
Forty-three nations sent alpine skiers to compete in the events in Calgary. Guatemala, the US Virgin Islands, and Puerto Rico made their Olympic alpine skiing debuts. Below is a list of the competing nations; in parentheses are the number of national competitors.

See also
Alpine skiing at the 1988 Winter Paralympics

References

Works cited

External links
FIS-Ski.com – alpine skiing – 1988 Winter Olympics – Calgary, Canada

 
1988 Winter Olympics events
Alpine skiing at the Winter Olympics
Winter Olympics
Alpine skiing competitions in Canada